is a Japanese football player. He currently plays for Hokkaido Consadole Sapporo in J1 League.

National team career
In June 2011, Fukai was elected Japan U-17 national team for 2011 U-17 World Cup and he played 4 matches.

Club statistics
Updated to 18 July 2022.

References

External links

Profile at Consadole Sapporo

1995 births
Living people
Association football people from Hokkaido
Japanese footballers
Japan youth international footballers
J1 League players
J2 League players
Hokkaido Consadole Sapporo players
Association football midfielders
Sportspeople from Sapporo